USS Towner (AKA-77) was a  in service with the United States Navy from 1944 to 1946. She was sold into commercial service and was scuttled in 1967.

History
Towner was named after Towner County, North Dakota. She was laid down as a Type C2-S-AJ3 ship under Maritime Commission contract (MC hull 1383) on 8 April 1944 at Wilmington, North Carolina, by the North Carolina Shipbuilding Co.; launched on 13 June 1944; sponsored by Mrs. Harold Broudy; acquired by the Navy from the War Shipping Administration on 27 June 1944; and commissioned on 3 December 1944.

World War II, 1944–1945
The two ships transited the Panama Canal on 10 January and headed for Hawaii the next day, arriving at Pearl Harbor on the 25th.
 
Towner stood out to sea again on 9 February bound for New Caledonia and arrived at Nouméa 10 days later. For the next two and one-half months, she made shuttle runs to Uarai Bay and participated in amphibious training exercises. In late April, Towner loaded elements of the 710th Tank Battalion and, with Transport Division 33, sortied on 3 May for the Philippines. She unloaded at Dulag on the 16th and reported to the 7th Fleet the following week. On 27 May, she sailed independently, via Hollandia, to Milne Bay to load a deck cargo of boats which she delivered to Manus. In early June, she loaded base hospital units at Lae for transportation to the Philippines and unloaded them at Manila on the 16th. From mid-June to mid-October, she shuttled troops and cargo from New Guinea to the Philippines.

Post-war activities, 1945
On 26 August, Towner joined the Transport Division of the 3rd Amphibious Force at Cebu to assist in carrying troops and equipment of the Americal Division to Japan. The convoy sortied on 1 September and arrived at Yokohama a week later. Towner discharged her troops and cargo and was back in the Philippines on the 17th. In early October, she made another round-trip to Tokyo Bay. The cargo ship departed Leyte on 24 October and, after calling at Okinawa and Taku, arrived at Tsingtao on 17 November. On 2 December 1945, Towner proceeded — via Guam, Guadalcanal, the Russell Islands, and Hawaii — to the United States.

Decommissioning
Towner arrived at Seattle on 25 January 1946 and entered the Bremerton Navy Yard for voyage repairs. She got underway for the east coast on 19 March and arrived at Norfolk on 10 April. Towner was decommissioned on 10 June 1946, returned to the War Shipping Administration on 13 June, and was struck from the Navy List on 19 June 1946 and sold for use as a civilian cargo vessel.

Civilian service and fate

After being sold by the Navy, ex-USS Towner was renamed  (in succession) SS Philippine Bear, SS Kaimana, and SS Guam Bear. She served as a cargo ship for various carriers until July 1967 when (as Guam Bear in the service of Pacific Far East Lines) she was involved in a collision outside Apra Harbor, Guam.

References 

Navsource.org
Wrecksite.eu

External links

 
 51 Years of AKAs

 

Tolland-class attack cargo ships
Towner County, North Dakota
World War II amphibious warfare vessels of the United States
Ships built in Wilmington, North Carolina
1944 ships